Beverly Mashinini is a Paralympian athlete from South Africa competing mainly in category F35/36 throws events.

Beverley competed in all three throws in the 2004 Summer Paralympics in Athens winning a bronze medal in the F35-38 javelin.

External links
 profile on paralympic.org

Paralympic athletes of South Africa
Athletes (track and field) at the 2004 Summer Paralympics
Paralympic bronze medalists for South Africa
Living people
Medalists at the 2004 Summer Paralympics
Year of birth missing (living people)
Paralympic medalists in athletics (track and field)
South African female javelin throwers